Wang Qiang (born 23 April 1993) is a Chinese cross-country skier. He competed in the 2018 and 2022 Winter Olympics. Wang finished 2nd at the World Cup sprint race in Drammen, Norway on March 3, 2022, making him the first Chinese athlete to ever ascend the podium in a World Cup competition. By the end of the season he finished 36th in the World Cup league table, putting him ahead of Liu Yuanyuan to become the best Chinese cross-country skier of all time.

Cross-country skiing results
All results are sourced from the International Ski Federation (FIS).

Olympic Games

Distance reduced to 30 km due to weather conditions.

World Championships

World Cup

Season standings

Individual podiums
 1 podium – (1 , 0 )

References

1993 births
Living people
Cross-country skiers at the 2018 Winter Olympics
Cross-country skiers at the 2022 Winter Olympics
Chinese male cross-country skiers
Olympic cross-country skiers of China
Cross-country skiers at the 2017 Asian Winter Games
People from Yichun, Heilongjiang
Skiers from Heilongjiang